The Men's 57 kg event at the 2010 South American Games had its quarterfinals held on March 22, the semifinals on March 24 and the final on March 27.

Medalists

Results

References
Report

60kg M